Karelitz may refer to:

 Yiddish name of Karelichy (also Korelits, Korelitsh)
 Avrohom Yeshaya Karelitz (1878–1953)
 Nissim Karelitz, the chairman of the beis din tzedek (rabbinical court) of Bnei Brak